The Lomita Railroad Museum is a museum in Lomita, California devoted to California railroad history. “Exhibits include a full-size steam locomotive with tender and caboose, and a station housing scale models, photographs and paintings of trains.” 

It was founded by Irene Lewis in the early 1960s on a single lot in the middle of a residential part of Lomita, and had its grand opening on June 23, 1967.  The museum building is a replica of a 19th-century depot, Boston & Maine's Greenwood Station that once stood in Wakefield, Massachusetts, and there is a full size replica of a water tower.  The museum grounds now function as a small public park.

Rolling Stock
The museum's collection includes:

 1902 Baldwin steam locomotive
 Southern Pacific tender
 1910 Union Pacific caboose
 Santa Fe caboose
 Union Pacific boxcar
 Union Oil tank car

References

External links 
 Official Lomita Railroad Museum website

Railroad museums in California
Museums in Los Angeles County, California
Lomita, California
Museums established in 1966
1966 establishments in California